The A1 highway in Botswana is a road that runs from the Zimbabwean border near Ramokgwebana through Francistown, Mahalapye, Palapye, Gaborone (the capital city of Botswana) and Lobatse, to Ramatlabama at the border with South Africa. Crossing the Ramokgwebana River into Zimbabwe, it continues as the A7 to Bulawayo.
On the South African end it continues as the N18 to Mahikeng.

Decisions were made to install a toll point along that road in 2007.

A section of the highway between Phakalane and Gaborone is used for the Gaborone City Marathon.

The entire A1 road is part of Trans-African Highway Network no. 4 (Cairo-Cape Town Highway), which links Cairo with Cape Town.

References

Roads in Botswana